Luhyňa is a village and municipality in the Trebišov District in the Košice Region of south-eastern Slovakia.

History
In historical records the village was first mentioned in 1263.

Geography
The village lies at an altitude of 187 metres and covers an area of 6.835 km².
It has a population of about 315 people.

Ethnicity
The village is about 98% Slovak.

Facilities
The village has a public library and a football pitch.

External links
https://web.archive.org/web/20070427022352/http://www.statistics.sk/mosmis/eng/run.html
http://www.gymtv.sk

Villages and municipalities in Trebišov District